Henryk Kocój (born 1931 in Oświęcim) is a Polish historian. Professor of the Silesian University, he specializes in the Polish history of the 17th and 18th century, in particular, the history of the Constitution of 3 May, Great Sejm, and the partitions of Poland.

Henryk Kocój was born in Oświęcim. He studied at the Jagiellonian University.

Publications 
 Śląsk a insurekcja kościuszkowska, Katowice 1986
 Zaborcy wobec Konstytucji 3 Maja, Katowice 1991
 Der Untergang des Mai – Verfassung vom 1791 im Lichte der Korrespondenz Friedrich Wilhelm II mit dem Preußischen Gesandten Girolamo Lucchesini, Katowice 1999
 Elektor saski Fryderyk August III wobec Konstytucji 3 Maja, Kraków 1999
 Prusy wobec powstania kościuszkowskiego, Katowice 1999
 Konstytucja 3 Maja w relacjach posła austriackiego w Warszawie Benedykta de Cachégo, Katowice 1999
 Konstytucja 3 Maja w relacjach posła saskiego Franciszka Essena, Katowice 1999
 Problem sukcesji saskiej w latach 1791–1792 w świetle ówczesnej korespondencji dyplomatycznej z Drezna i Merseburga (wybór materiałów archiwalnych), Katowice 1999
 Dyplomacja pruska w przeddzień II rozbioru Polski (wybór materiałów archiwalnych), Katowice 2000
 Beiträge zur Preussens Stellung gegenüber dem Kościuszko- Aufstand vom Jahre 1794. Ausgewählte Probleme, Katowice 2000
 Od Sejmu Wielkiego do powstania listopadowego. Wybór materiałów źródłowych, artykułów i recenzji, Kraków 2002
 Targowica i sejm grodzieński 1793 w relacjach posła pruskiego Ludwiga Buchholtza, Kraków 2005
 Berlin wobec Konstytucji 3 maja, Kraków 2007
 Relacje posła pruskiego Ludwiga Buchholtza o insurekcji kościuszkowskiej, Kraków 2007
 Upadek Konstytucji 3 maja w świetle korespondencji Fryderyka Wilhelma II z posłem pruskim, Katowice 2008
 Austria wobec Konstytucji 3 maja, Kraków 2008
 Plany II rozbioru Polski w polityce Berlina w latach 1791–1792, Katowice 2008

References

External links
 Henryk Kocój

1931 births
20th-century Polish historians
Polish male non-fiction writers
Living people
Academic staff of the University of Silesia in Katowice